Genting SkyWorlds is an amusement park at Resorts World Genting, Genting Highlands, Malaysia. It was formerly known as 20th Century Fox World Malaysia, a movie inspired theme park project by 20th Century Fox, but had pulled out its licensing deal. 

The theme park was renamed after reaching a settlement with 20th Century Fox and The Walt Disney Company. As a result of the settlement, some of the worlds and rides featuring 20th Century Studios and Blue Sky Studios properties were retained through a license from Disney, whereas some of the other planned worlds and rides were scrapped and instead repurposed into original ones.

History

20th Century Fox World was first announced on 26 July 2013 and commenced its construction on 17 December 2013 with a cost of estimated RM1 billion.

The project was part of a major ten-year masterplan the refurbishment of infrastructure at Resorts World Genting. It replaced the previous Genting Outdoor theme park which was closed on 1 September 2013. 

The theme park is 26 acres in size and would feature roughly 25 thrill rides and attractions based on a wide range of films and franchises like Blue Sky Studios Ice Age, Rio and Epic, Life of Pi, Night at the Museum, Planet of the Apes, Alien vs. Predator, Titanic, Sons of Anarchy, and Independence Day.

Delays
Once expected to open in 2016, the opening was delayed to 2019 and subsequently to 2022. However, in 2018, Fox Entertainment terminated its agreement with Genting. Genting Group still planned to open the park in the future, but the opening date was postponed while the operator considered various options, including rebranding the theme park. The theme park would only open on 8 February 2022 but as a soft opening.

Lawsuit
On 26 November 2018, Genting Malaysia filed a $1.75 billion lawsuit against Disney and Fox, accusing Fox of trying to back out of the deal for licensing the theme park. In the suit, Genting Malaysia alleged that Fox had taken steps to cancel the contract. The suit also named Disney as a defendant, contending that Disney's executives, following the company's then-pending acquisition of Fox, were "calling the shots" on the project. Disney was opposed to the park because they would have "no control" over its operations and that it would be adjacent to a casino, which goes against Disney's "family-friendly" image. Fox, in turn, referred to the suit as "without merit", stating that their reasons for withdrawing from the deal were due to Genting consistently not meeting "agreed-upon deadlines for several years" and that Genting's attempts to blame Disney for Fox's default were "made up".

Fox filed a $46 million countersuit against Genting on 23 January 2019. In the suit, Fox stated that the reason for their termination of the project was "Genting alone", blaming Genting's "incompetence, inexperience, and rank indifference to its contractual obligations" as the reason the project fell through. Fox alleged that Genting changed agreed-upon plans "at the whim" of Genting Group chairman Lim Kok Thay and that Genting would construct "buildings that were too tall for the themed facades constructed to house them, built parade floats that were so large that they left no room on the street for spectators, built an attraction without including the designed (or any) evacuation route, and routinely had to retrofit, if not tear down, its prematurely built structures". Genting responded by stating that Fox's countersuit was filed to "divert attention away from its own incompetence and inexperience" and went on to say that the company "will prove that Fox's termination was both unfounded and improperly directed by Disney and Fox's parent company, Twenty First Century Fox."

On 26 July, it was announced that Fox and Genting had settled their respective lawsuits. As part of the deal, Genting would be granted "a license to use certain Fox intellectual properties", and that non-Fox intellectual property would make up the rest of the attractions in the park. The outdoor park would also no longer be referred to as 20th Century Fox World, but instead would be named Genting SkyWorlds.

Virtual Queue (VQ) 

On July 1, 2022, it was announced that Genting Skyworlds would partner up with Alibaba Cloud to present their new Virtual Queue (VQ) system which is powered with artificial intelligence. The system would allow guests to pre-book the theme park's attractions in advance through their Genting Skyworlds application and eliminate the need for guests to queue up at the attractions. The Virtual Queue application is fed with real-time data to allow park operators to "control crowd dispersion and optimise ride capacity".

Attractions

The park currently has nine themed worlds: Andromeda Base, Central Park, Unnamed Bison, Epic, Ice Age, Liberty Lane, Rio, Robots Rivet Town, and Studio Plaza.

Andromeda Base

Central Park

Eagle Mountain

Epic
A area wedged into the park's corner themed to the Epic 2013 computer-animated film.

Ice Age
An area themed to the Ice Age franchise.

Liberty Lane
An alleyway modeled after San Francisco, which connects Central Park to Andromeda Base.

Rio
The area is modeled after Rio de Janeiro and themed to the Rio animated films.

Robots Rivet Town
A secluded area themed to the Robots 2005 animated film. The area's two attractions, Bigweld's Zeppelins and Rivet Town Roller, are both stacked on top of one another in order to save space. Entry to the area is gained through the Liberty Lane pathway.

See also
 20th Century Fox World (Dubai)
 Legoland Malaysia Resort
 MAPS Perak
 Skytropolis Funland
 Universal Studios Singapore
 SamaWorld (Genting Highlands)

References

External links

 

2022 establishments in Malaysia
Amusement parks in Malaysia
Genting Highlands
20th Century Studios
Walt Disney Parks and Resorts